Giovanni Malatesta (died 1304), known, from his lameness, as Gianciotto, or Giovanni, lo Sciancato, was the eldest son of Malatesta da Verucchio of Rimini.

From 1275 onwards he played an active part in the Romagnole Wars and factions. He is chiefly famous for the domestic tragedy of 1285, recorded in Dante's Inferno, when, having detected his wife, Francesca da Polenta (Francesca da Rimini), in adultery with his brother Paolo, he killed them both with his own hands. 

He captured Pesaro in 1294, and ruled it as podestà until his death.

See also
1308–1321 Divine Comedy. (Inferno, Canto V), Dante

References

13th-century births
1304 deaths
Giovanni
Characters in the Divine Comedy
13th-century Italian people